The Dirty Girls is a 1965 American erotic drama film directed by Radley Metzger.

Plot
Garance, a liberated woman, entertains several aquaintenances in Paris, the City of Love; while Monique, also liberated, has similar experiences in Munich.

Cast 
 Reine Rohan as Monique
 Denyse Roland	as Garance
 Marlene Sherter as Nadia
 Peter Parten as Robert Marshall
 Anne Stengel as Madelene
 Lionel Bernier as Michel

Reception
Several film reviews of The Dirty Girls have been favorable with one reviewer noting that the film has a certain amount of "camp value".

Notes
According to one film reviewer, Radley Metzger's films, including those made during the Golden Age of Porn (1969–1984), are noted for their "lavish design, witty screenplays, and a penchant for the unusual camera angle". Another reviewer noted that his films were "highly artistic — and often cerebral ... and often featured gorgeous cinematography". Film and audio works by Metzger have been added to the permanent collection of the Museum of Modern Art (MoMA) in New York City.

References

External links
 The Dirty Girls at  MUBI (related to The Criterion Collection)
 

American erotic drama films
Films directed by Radley Metzger
1965 films
1960s erotic drama films
1965 drama films
1960s English-language films
1960s American films